Anchuruli, also spelled Anjuruli, is an emerging tourist destination and a catchment area of Idukki arch dam in Kanchiyar village near Kattappana in the district of Idukki in Kerala state, India.

Etymology 
The name Anchuruli literally means 'five vessels'. It is associated with the five small hills which are in the shape of inverted vessels and are visible when the water level in Idukki reservoir reduces.

Location 

It lies in the Kanchiyar grama panchayath in the newly formed Idukki constituency. The place can be accessed from Kanchiyar (3 km) which is on the Kattappana - Kuttikkanam state highway (SH-59).

Proposals for tourism development 

Anchuruli at present is on the eve of a major tourism development which would be fulfilled soon. The panchayath is planning several strategies for the upliftment of Anchuruli into a major tourist destination in the district by combining the nearby Ayyappancoil village, which holds an ancient Sastha shrine and a hanging (suspension) bridge. Several proposals are also made regarding the boat service to Cheruthoni through the Idukki reservoir. If the proposals became fruitful, the journey to Cheruthoni will take only 20 minutes and it would be a great relief to the locals who have to travel about 30 km distance by road.

Filming location 
The climax scene of 2014 Malayalam movie Iyobinte Pusthakam was shot in Anchuruli tunnel. Sequences of movies like Lord Livingstone 7000 Kandi, Maramkothi and Raksha were shot here.

References 

Tourist attractions in Idukki district
Villages in Idukki district